The Campeonato Nacional de Liga de Fútbol Indoor (National Championship Indoor Football League), commonly known for sponsorship reasons Liga Fertiberia,  is an indoor football competition in Spain and Portugal, operated by the Asociación de Fútbol Indoor. Is played with players over the age of 30, former football players.

Honours

See also
 Copa de España de Fútbol Indoor
 Supercopa de España de Fútbol Indoor

References

External links
 Official site

Football leagues in Spain
Indoor soccer competitions
2008 establishments in Spain
Sports leagues established in 2008